Rony Alberto Flores Sánchez (born 28 September 1984) is a Honduran football striker.

Club career
Rony Flores debuted on August 24, 2003 with Real Juventud, in the game that his team lost 1–3 against Motagua in Santa Bárbara. Flores went to United States legally. After playing in New Orleans, he traveled to Uruguay and was hired by the Bella Vista. He went also through Atenas de San Carlos and Sud América.

In 2010, Rony Flores joined Marathón. His successful spell at Marathon made Flores was hired by Shenzhen Ruby in 2011. After a year, he returned to Honduras to rejoin Marathón.

International career
Flores made one international appearance for Honduras, playing a friendly against Panama in 2010.

References

1984 births
Living people
People from Tela
Honduran footballers
Honduras international footballers
Honduran expatriate footballers
Real Maya players
C.D. Marathón players
Juticalpa F.C. players
Shenzhen F.C. players
Chinese Super League players
China League One players
Expatriate footballers in China
Expatriate footballers in Uruguay
Association football forwards